The VMI Keydets men's soccer team is an intercollegiate varsity sports team of the Virginia Military Institute. The team is a member of the Southern Conference of the National Collegiate Athletic Association.

Historically, VMI has been one of the weakest NCAA Division I men's soccer programs. In their 60-year existence, the Keydets have only had two seasons with a winning record (1990 and 2004), and three seasons with a conference winning record (1976, 1977, and 1982). The program went for an NCAA record 67-match losing streak from 2014 until 2018, where they won against an NCAA Division III opponent. Prior to the varsity program, VMI had a club team which competed from the late 1870s until 1959. The club team has been retroactively deemed national champions by the American Soccer History Archives for the 1885 and 1889 college soccer seasons.

The program's best performance in the regular season came in 1977 where they finished as Southern Conference runners-up.

Seasons

Coaching history

Notes

References

External links 
 

 
Association football clubs established in 1960
1960 establishments in Virginia
Military soccer clubs in the United States